Star Lake is located by Star Lake, New York. Fish species present in the lake are largemouth bass, smallmouth bass, rainbow trout, landlocked salmon, brown trout, white sucker, sunfish, rock bass, yellow perch, and black bullhead. There is carry-down launch access with permission from the Town of Fine, on route 3.

References 

Lakes of New York (state)
Lakes of St. Lawrence County, New York